Pseudochilus is a small Afrotropical genus of potter wasps consisting of 5 currently known species.

References

Biological pest control wasps
Potter wasps